"Fighting" is a song co-written and recorded by Canadian country artist Tyler Joe Miller. The song was co-written with Dan Swinimer, Dave Faber, and Wes Mack. It was the third single off his extended play Sometimes I Don't, But Sometimes I Do.

Background
Miller stated that the song is about "fighting with yourself and your insecurities to overcome them and try to become a better person".

Critical reception
Country Town named the song "Song of the Day", noting how it takes on mental illness and "emphasises the message of ‘one day at a time’".

Music video
The official music video for "Fighting" premiered on February 4, 2021. The video included a message about suicide prevention and seeking help for mental health.

Charts
"Fighting" reached a peak of number eight on the Billboard Canada Country chart, and #85 on the Canadian Hot 100.

References

2020 songs
2020 singles
Tyler Joe Miller songs
Songs written by Tyler Joe Miller
Song recordings produced by Danick Dupelle